The 1981 Camel GT Championship season was the 11th season of the IMSA GT Championship auto racing series.  It was a series for GTX class Group 5 cars and GTO and GTU class Grand tourer cars.  It began January 31, 1981, and ended November 29, 1981, after sixteen rounds.

Schedule
The GTU class did not participate with the GTX and GTO classes in shorter events, instead holding their own separate event which included touring car competitors from the IMSA Champion Spark Plug Challenge, but did not race for points in the IMSA GT Championship.  Races marked with All had all classes on track at the same time.

Season results

External links
 World Sports Racing Prototypes - 1981 IMSA GT Championship results

IMSA GT Championship seasons
IMSA GT